ZFP92 zinc finger protein is a protein that in humans is encoded by the ZFP92 gene.

References

Further reading 

 
 

Genes
Human proteins